Alloy broadening is a spectral-line broadening mechanism caused by random distribution of the atoms in an alloy.

The alloy broadening is one of the line broadening mechanisms. The random distribution of atoms in an alloy causes a different material composition at different positions. In semiconductors and insulators the different material composition leads to different band gap energies. This gives different exciton recombination energies. Therefore, depending on the position where an exciton recombines the emitted light has a different energy. The alloy broadening is an inhomogeneous line broadening, meaning that its shape is Gaussian.

Binary alloy
In the mathematical description it is assumed that no clustering occurs within the alloy. Then, for a binary alloy of the form A_{1-x}B_{x}, e.g. Si_{1-x}Ge_{x}, the standard deviation of the composition is given by: 

,

where  is the number of atoms within the excitons' volume, i.e.  with  being the atoms per volume. 
In general, the band gap energy  of a semiconducting alloy depends on the composition, i.e. . The band gap energy can be considered to be the fluorescence energy. Therefore, the standard deviation in fluorescence is  

 

As the alloy broadening belongs to the group of inhomogeneous broadenings the line shape of the fluorescence intensity  is Gaussian:

References

Physical chemistry